Shah Alam Market (or Shahalmi Market or Shah Alami) is one of the largest markets in Lahore, Pakistan.

The "Shah-Almi Gate" is named after Mughal emperor Shah Alam I, son of Aurangzeb. Prior to his death, the gate was called the "Bherwala Gate". During the 1947 partition riots, the gate was burned. Today only the name survives. Shah Alam Market is one of Lahore's biggest commercial markets, "Shah Almi Market" or Shahalmi as locals call it, exists near the site of the gate. This is one of the 12 Doors of Lahore. Its location can be traced at the sidelines of Shah Almi Market, Lahore.

Bazaars in Shah Alam Market 
There are more than 25 bazaars in Shah Alam Market. The famous one includes Pappar Mandi, Rang Mahal, Bottle Bazzar, Sarafa Bazaar.

Partition
Before partition Shahalmi was mostly a Hindu populated area with businesses owned by Hindus. During the 1947 partition most of the Hindus fled to India and left this place.

Location
Shahalmi market is near Mayo Chowk opposite shop, Lahore. Mayo Chowk is next to Mayo Hospital gate. After arriving at Mayo Chowk a one-way traffic road leads toward the entrance of Shahalmi Market. The place is very populated and has a small road.

References

External links
 Shahalmi Online

Retail markets in Lahore